The 2013 Kentucky Wildcats football team represented the University of Kentucky in the 2013 NCAA Division I FBS football season. The Wildcats competed as a member of the Southeastern Conference (SEC) as part of its Eastern Division. The team was led by head coach Mark Stoops, in his first year and played its home games at Commonwealth Stadium in Lexington, Kentucky.

Preseason

Spring game
The 2013 Blue/White Spring Game at Commonwealth Stadium saw the Blue squad squeak out a one-point victory over the White team in the annual scrimmage, 24–23.  The program witnessed its largest attendance for a spring game in program history with 50,831 fans.

The Kentucky faithful finally got to see a glimpse of what the new coaching staff had been working on since joining the Big Blue Nation with Stoops coming on board in late November. Stoops promised to bring a new approach to the defensive side of the ball with his offense revisiting a familiar style of play from air-raid era with an up-tempo offense.  As the Wildcats put five passing touchdowns on the board, it marked the return of the old air raid sirens that once carried through the Lexington skies on game day.

With very little decided in the way of starters and roles, all five of Kentucky's quarterbacks received reps during Saturday evening's scrimmage, with the majority of the opportunities going to Maxwell Smith, Patrick Towles and Jalen Whitlow. Coach Stoops and offensive coordinator Neal Brown have yet to determine who their starting quarterback will be going into the fall, and with very little chance to see them up-close and personal, there's no hurry to name one.  However, with fairly equal playing time divvied up amongst the signal callers, it was Whitlow who threw and rushed for the most yardage in Brown's new-look schemes.  Whitlow did a little bit of everything in the game, displaying a strong, accurate arm, finding multiple receivers, and showing off his speed which gives him a unique, additional element to his game. He finished the night 17-of-28 with 193 yards and two touchdowns through the air, while scampering for 49 net yards on seven attempts on the ground while toggling back and forth between the Blue and White squads.

Class of 2013 signees

Personnel

Roster

Starters by game
Offense

Defense

Schedule

Source:

Game summaries

Western Kentucky

Sources:

Keshawn Simpson ran for a pair of 3-yard touchdowns and Antonio Andrews added his own 3-yard score as Western Kentucky beat Kentucky 35–26 Saturday night making coach Bobby Petrino a winner in his debut.

The Hilltoppers also beat their in-state rival for a second straight year, though they didn't need overtime like they did last year in this win over the Southeastern Conference program. They outgained Kentucky 487–419 in total offense and held the ball for 35 minutes.

Brandon Doughty was 27 of 34 for 271 yards and a TD, numbers that would have been better except for at least four drops including a would-be touchdown.

The loss ruined Kentucky coach Mark Stoops' debut. Coordinator Neal Brown's Air Raid offense struggled against a Western Kentucky defense returning seven starters from a bowl team that went 7–6 last season in the Sun Belt Conference.

Miami (OH)

Sources:

Maxwell Smith threw three long touchdown passes and Jalen Whitlow and Raymond Sanders each added scoring runs as Kentucky beat Miami (Ohio) 41–7 on Saturday.

The Wildcats made a winner of first-year coach Mark Stoops and Smith, who started for the first time since a season-ending ankle injury last September.

Most importantly for the Wildcats (1–1) was how Smith helped offensive coordinator Neal Brown's pass-oriented "Air Raid" philosophy take flight with TD passes of 48 yards to Jonathan George, 88 to Javess Blue and 56 to Jeff Badet. He completed 15 of 23 passes for 310 yards, 210 by halftime, as Kentucky outgained Miami 675–122 and allowed the RedHawks' only score on a fumbled punt return.

Louisville

Sources:

Heisman hopeful Teddy Bridgewater got off to a slow start as Kentucky's defense kept him and his receivers in check for much of the first half.  He began 1 of 4 for 10 yards and had just 58 yards through one quarter, looking especially out of sync in throwing behind Robert Clark after the Cardinals recovered a Whitlow fumble at the Wildcats 27.  Wallace salvaged the drive with a 36-yard field goal for a 3–0 lead.  Even when Bridgewater seemed to get going in hitting Parker for 10 yards, the receiver fumbled and Kentucky's Ashley Lowery recovered, setting up Mansour's 37-yard field to tie the game.

The Wildcats' defense closed running lanes for Michael Dyer and other Cardinals backs and even sacking Bridgewater for just the second time this season.  But Kentucky's offense couldn't take advantage as receivers dropped passes from Maxwell Smith–who took all but two snaps in the first half–while Raymond Sanders fumbled a handoff at the Louisville 13 late in the second quarter.  Smith and Whitlow combined to complete just 17 of 37 passes for 214 yards for the Wildcats.

Senorise Perry ran for 100 yards and two touchdowns and Bridgewater overcame a shaky start to pass for 250 yards and No. 7 Louisville scored on four consecutive drives to pull away from rival Kentucky for a 27–13 victory on Saturday.  Perry finished with 100 yards on 11 carries while Bridgewater completed 16 of 28 attempts to help the Cardinals earn their third straight Governor's Cup.

Florida

Sources:

Joe Mansour's 25-yard run on a fake field goal was the only TD for Kentucky (1–3, 0–1), which was outgained 402–173.  That trick play was Kentucky's only highlight on a night that largely belonged to Murphy and the Gators.

Matt Jones rushed for 176 yards and a touchdown and Tyler Murphy threw for 156 yards and a score as No. 20 Florida beat Kentucky 24–7 on Saturday night, its 27th straight win over the Wildcats.  Jones, who had 28 carries, outgained Kentucky by himself while he and Murphy provided all of the Gators' touchdowns in the first half to extend the longest active winning streak over a major opponent.  Murphy also rushed for a 3-yard TD in his first career start for the Gators (3–1, 2–0 Southeastern Conference), who closed a difficult week on a high note after losing starting quarterback Jeff Driskel and defensive tackle Dominique Easley to season-ending injuries.

Florida gave Gators wide receivers coach Joker Phillips a happy return after his firing last fall as Wildcats coach.

South Carolina

Sources:

Kentucky (1–4, 0–2) rallied from a 21–0 deficit to pull within 6 at 27–21 with 11:50 left in the game but could not complete the comeback to upset #13 South Carolina. They were still only down 7 with 4 minutes remaining after a 1-yard touchdown run by Jalen Witlow but South Carolina was able to run out the clock behind SEC leading rusher Mike Davis and beat Kentucky for the 13th time in the last 14 meetings.

South Carolina senior quarterback Connor Shaw completed 17 of 20 passes for 262 yards and rushed for 50 yards. Kentucky quarterback Jalen Witlow complete 17 of 24 passes for 178 yards and 2 touchdowns and rushed for 69 yards and a touchdown. Mike Davis rushed for 106 yards and scored 2 touchdowns for the Gamecocks.

South Carolina played without star defensive end Jadeveon Clowney who was out with an injury.

Alabama

Sources:

T.J. Yeldon and Kenyan Drake each ran for two touchdowns and No. 1 Alabama brushed off a few early mistakes to blow out Kentucky 48–7.

After a scoreless first quarter thanks to fumbles by the running backs and dropped passes in Kentucky territory, the Crimson Tide (6–0, 3–0) scored on their last eight possessions and outgained the Wildcats (1–5, 0–3) 668–170. Alabama gained 369 yards through the air including a career-high 359 yards by A. J. McCarron. Kentucky's only score came in the 3rd quarter on a 30-yard touchdown pass from Maxwell Smith to Javess Blue.

Kentucky quarterback Jalen Witlow was injured on a sack early in the game and did not return.

Mississippi State

Sources:

Dak Prescott threw for 268 yards and two touchdowns and also caught a 17-yard touchdown pass to lead Mississippi State past Kentucky. Prescott completed a career-high 23 of 34 passes and also rushed for 33 yards. Jameon Lewis had a 19-yard touchdown run, caught a 17-yard scoring pass and also threw the 17-yard touchdown to Prescott on a trick play.

Kentucky's Joe Mansour made a 44-yard field goal with 8:15 remaining to pull the Wildcats to 28–22, but the Wildcats could get no closer. They had pulled to 21–19 in the third quarter on Jojo Kemp's 14-yard touchdown run. Then in what proved to be a key moment, the Wildcats recovered an onside kick, only to have it disallowed because of an offside penalty.

Maxwell Smith completed 18 of 33 passes for 160 yards and a touchdown. Raymond Sanders rushed for 86 and Jojo Kemp rushed for 63 and a touchdown to lead the Wildcats.

Alabama State

Missouri

Vanderbilt

Georgia

Tennessee

References

Kentucky
Kentucky Wildcats football seasons
Kentucky Wildcats football